Berenjeh is a village in Chaman Rural District, Takht-e Soleyman District, Takab County, West Azerbaijan Province, Iran. At the 2006 census, its population was 77, in 13 families.

References 

Populated places in Takab County